Trichoderma paucisporum is a species of endophytic fungus in the family Hypocreaceae. It was first isolated in Ecuador from cacao pods infected with frosty pod rot, Moniliophthora roreri. It produces a volatile antibiotic that inhibits development of M. roreri.

References

Further reading

Bailey, Bryan A., et al. "The endophytic Trichoderma hamatum isolate DIS 219b enhances seedling growth and delays the onset of drought stress in Theobroma cacao." Endophytes of Forest Trees. Springer Netherlands, 2011. 157–172.

External links

MycoBank

Fungal plant pathogens and diseases
Trichoderma
Fungi described in 2006